Symphony No. 3 in C minor may refer to:

 Edgar Bainton's Symphony No. 3 (completed 1956)
 Frederic Hymen Cowen's Symphony No. 3 Scandinavian (1880)
 Friedrich Gernsheim's Symphony No. 3, op. 54 "Mirjam" (1888)
 Witold Maliszewski's Symphony No. 3, op. 14
 Florence Price's Symphony No. 3 (1940)
 Sergei Prokofiev's Symphony No. 3, op. 44 (1928)
 Julius Röntgen's Symphony No. 3 (1910)
 Camille Saint-Saëns's Symphony No. 3, op. 78 "Organ" (1886)
 Symphony No. 3, op. 43 "The Divine Poem" (1904)
 Louis Spohr's Symphony No. 3, op. 78 (1828)
 Richard Wüerst's Symphony No. 3 (1861)

See also
 List of symphonies in C minor